Grey Island is  south of Michelsen Island and  west of the southern part of Fredriksen Island, in the South Orkney Islands of Antarctica. It was first charted and named Holmen Graa (Grey Island) on a map by the Norwegian whaler Captain Petter Sorlle, who made a running survey of the South Orkney Islands in 1912–13. The anglicised form appears on the chart by Discovery Investigations personnel on the Discovery II who surveyed the islands in 1933.

Important Bird Area
The island lies within an Antarctic Specially Protected Area (ASPA 111).  It is also part of the Southern Powell Island and adjacent islands Important Bird Area (IBA), identified as such by BirdLife International because it supports significant seabird breeding colonies.

See also 
 List of Antarctic and subantarctic islands

References

Islands of the South Orkney Islands
Important Bird Areas of Antarctica
Seabird colonies
Antarctic Specially Protected Areas